Ridya Aulia Fatasya (born 22 February 2003) is an Indonesian badminton player.

Achievements

BWF International Challenge/Series (2 runners-up) 
Women's doubles

  BWF International Challenge tournament
  BWF International Series tournament
  BWF Future Series tournament

Performance timeline

Individual competitions

Senior level 
 Women's doubles

References

External links 
 

2003 births
Living people
People from Semarang
Indonesian female badminton players
21st-century Indonesian women